The State Administration of Work Safety (SAWS), reporting to the State Council, is the non-ministerial agency of the Government of the People's Republic of China responsible for the regulation of risks to occupational safety and health in China.

List of directors
Li Yizhong (李毅中): February 2005 – March 2008
Wang Jun (王君): March 2008 – November 2008
Luo Lin (骆琳): December 2008 – December 2012
Yang Dongliang: December 2012 – August 2015 (fired; convicted of corruption and sentenced to 15 years in prison)
Yang Huanning: 14 October 2015 – July 2017 (fired)
Wang Yupu: September 2017 – incumbent

References

External links 
Official website of SAWS 
National Workplace Emergency Management Center (NWEMC)

Medical and health organizations based in China
Government agencies of China
Law enforcement in China
Occupational safety and health organizations
Safety organizations
State Council of the People's Republic of China